Biapenem (INN) is a carbapenem antibiotic. It has in vitro activity against anaerobes.
1-β-methyl-carbapenem antibiotic. Approved in Japan in 2001.

References

External links 
  Omegacin

Carbapenem antibiotics